The following radio stations broadcast on AM frequency 1040 kHz: 1040 AM is a United States clear-channel frequency. WHO Des Moines is the dominant station on 1040 AM.

In Argentina 
 LRG203 Antena in Santa Rosa

In Canada

In Mexico 
  in Santa Ana Tepetitlan, Jalisco
  in Palenque, Chiapas
  in Salamanca, Guanajuato

In the United States 
Stations in bold are clear-channel stations.

References

Lists of radio stations by frequency